Llandyfrydog is a village in Anglesey, in north-west Wales., in the community of Rhosybol.

Notable people 

 Hugh Davies (1739–1821) a Welsh botanist and Anglican clergyman; his father was the rector of St Tyfrydog's Church, Llandyfrydog.
 Nicholas Owen (1752–1811) a Welsh Anglican priest and antiquarian.
 Griffith W. Griffith (1883–1967) a Welsh Presbyterian minister

References

Villages in Anglesey
Rhosybol